Peter Polansky was the defending champion, but withdrew because of an elbow injury.

Sam Querrey won the title, defeating John Millman in the final, 6–4, 6–2.

Seeds

Draw

Finals

Top half

Bottom half

References
 Main draw
 Qualifying draw

2014 ATP Challenger Tour
2014 Singles